Kiffin is a name and may refer to:

 Chris Kiffin (born 1982), American football coach
 Irv Kiffin (born 1951), American basketball player
 Lane Kiffin (born 1975), American football coach
 Monte Kiffin (born 1940), American football coach
 William Kiffin (1616–1701), English Baptist minister

See also
 Kiffin Rockwell (1892–1916), American aviator